The 2016 Northern Iowa Panthers football team represented the University of Northern Iowa in the 2016 NCAA Division I FCS football season. The team was coached by Mark Farley in his sixteenth season and played their home games in the UNI-Dome. They were a member of the Missouri Valley Football Conference. They finished the season 5–6, 4–4 in MVFC play to finish in a tie for fourth place.

Personnel

Roster
2016 Roster

Coaching staff

Season

Schedule

 Source: Schedule
PSN (CFU Ch. 15/HD415; KCRG-TV Ch. 9.2; WHO-DT Ch. 13.2; KGCW Ch. 26, Comcast SportsNet Chicago)

Game summaries

at Iowa State

Montana

at Eastern Washington

Southern Illinois

at South Dakota

at Youngstown State

Missouri State

North Dakota State

at Indiana State

at Western Illinois

South Dakota State

Ranking movements

References

Northern Iowa
Northern Iowa Panthers football seasons
Northern Iowa Panthers football